Ehsan Naghibzadeh (also known as: Seyedehsan Naghibzadeh, born March 15, 1990, in Kermanshah, Iran) is a male Iranian Taekwondo practitioner, who lives in Switzerland. He is a former member of the Iranian Taekwondo National Team and a 4th DAN in Taekwondo. He is a gold medalist in 2010 West Asian Championships in Saudi Arabia, a silver medalist in the 2010 World University Championships in Spain and a silver medalist in the 2011 Asian Club Championships in Iran. Furthermore, he took part in the World Championships in Puebla, Mexico in 2013 for the Iranian Nationalteam, where the team achieved the 2nd place. 
Since 2019, he is an International Olympic Committee (IOC) refugee athlete scholarship holder for Tokyo Olympic Games. Since 2019, Naghibzadeh is competing as a refugee athlete. He won bronze at the European University Championships in Croatia in 2019. He also participated in the European Taekwondo Championships 2019 in Bari. Also in 2019, Naghibzadeh was part of the Booyoung Dream Program, which was held in South Korea. World Taekwondo selected 19 Olympic Hopefuls to be part of the program. In 2021, he participated in the European Taekwondo Championships in Sofia. Naghibzadeh also won medals in several international olympic ranking tournaments

Early life 
Naghibzadeh grew up in Kermanshah, Iran. He started with Taekwondo at the age of seven and became a professional Taekwondo athlete in Iran. He was part of the Iranian Nationalteam, one of the strongest teams in the world, for eight years.

Medals 
 2019 Lebanon Open: bronze 
 2019 University European Championships: bronze 
 2013 Spain Open: silver 
 2013 Taekwondo World Championships - Team 2nd place 
 2012 Iran Open: gold
 2011 Asian Club Championships: silver 
 2010 World University Championships: silver
 2010 West Asian Championships: gold 
 2010 Iran Championships: 3x gold (senior, university, U21/قهرمانى جوانان كشور) 
 2009 Iran Championships: gold 
 2008 Iran Championships: gold
 Iranian Olympiad: gold 
 2007 Iran Championships: 3x gold (senior, U21/قهرمانى جوانان كشور)
 2007 Iran Championships: bronze 
 2006 Iran Championships: gold
 2004 Iran Championships: 2x silver

References

External links 
 
 www.olympics.com
 
 news.un.org
 www.iritf.org.ir
 www.iritf.org.ir
 www.iritf.org.ir
 www.iritf.org.ir
 www.worldtaekwondo.org

1990 births
Living people
Iranian male taekwondo practitioners
Iranian refugees
Iranian emigrants to Switzerland